Aditya Birla Sun Life Asset Management Company Ltd. (ABSLAMC), formerly known as Birla Sun Life Asset Management Company Limited, is an investment managing company registered under the Securities and Exchange Board of India. It is a joint venture between the Aditya Birla Capital of India and the Sun Life Financial Inc. of Canada. The company offers sector-specific equity schemes, fund of fund schemes, hybrid and monthly income funds, debt and treasury products and offshore funds.

History
Birla Sun Life Asset Management Company was established in 1994 as a joint venture between the Aditya Birla Group and the Sun Life Financial of Canada where the former owns 51% and the rest by latter which is a leading  international financial services organization providing a diverse range of wealth accumulation, protection products, and services to individuals and corporate customers.

Aditya Birla Financial Services Group (ABFSG) is the umbrella brand for all the financial services business of The Aditya Birla Group. ABFSG ranks among the top five fund managers in India (including LIC) with an AUM of around Rs 3 trillion by 2021. The company provides life insurance, asset management, lending (excluding Housing), housing finance, equity & commodity broking, wealth management and distribution, online money management portal—Aditya Birla Money MyUniverse, general insurance advisory and private equity and health insurance businesses, for retail and corporate customers. The company has 14,000 employees and over 6 million customers, with 1,500 points of presence and about 130,000 agents/channel partners.

Sun Life Financial, Inc. operates in India through Aditya Birla Sun Life Asset Management. Established in 1994, Birla Sun Life Asset Management Company Ltd. (BSLAMC), investment manager for Birla Sun Life mutual fund, has been a joint venture between the Aditya Birla Group and Sun Life Financial Inc. since 1999. Birla Sun Life Mutual Fund was the fourth largest Fund house in India based on domestic average assets under management as published by AMFI for the quarter ended 31 March 2014.

On 20 April 2021, Aditya Birla Sun Life Asset management company filed Draft Red Herring Prospectus (DRHP) to the Securities and Exchange Board of India in order to raise funds through an initial public offering (IPO).

Aditya Birla Sun Life Asset management company's IPO subscriptions to open on 29 September 2021 and close on 1 October 2021 at a price band of Rs 695 - Rs 712 per share.

Mutual funds 

It offers a various investment schemes including debt and treasury products, investments including fund of fund schemes, Wealth Creation, Tax Savings, diversified and sector specific equity schemes and also introduced research-based investments, wealth management services, Regular Income Schemes, offshore funds, hybrid and monthly income funds, and Savings Schemes.  Till year 2020, it had the largest team of research analysts in the Insurance industry with operations in major worldwide markets, including the United Kingdom, United States, Canada, Japan, Indonesia, Philippines, Ireland, China, Hong Kong, Bermuda, and India.

See also 

 Mutual funds in India

References

 

Investment companies of India
Financial services companies of India
Financial services companies established in 1994
Insurance companies of India
Financial services companies based in Mumbai
1994 establishments in Maharashtra
Indian companies established in 1994